John B. Halcott (1846–1895) was an American architect who worked in New York State and in North Carolina.  In North Carolina, he was credited with architectural design of the New York State Capitol, which everywhere else is credited to others. 

Built in 1883 by contractors Mull & Fromer, the Greene County Office Building in Cairo, New York, formerly the Greene County Alms House, was designed by John B. Halcott (1846–1895), architect.

In North Carolina, he designed:
A Second Empire design for the Wake County, North Carolina courthouse
Three commercial buildings in Durham, North Carolina
Somerset Villa, built 1888, in Durham, North Carolina, a mansion for tobacco industrialist Julian S. Carr, termed "Halcott's most spectacular project in North Carolina"
and other works.

References

1846 births
1895 deaths
Architects from North Carolina
Architects from New York (state)
19th-century American architects